Hunters of the Golden Cobra (Italian: I Cacciatori del Cobra d'Oro) is an Italian 1982 action film starring David Warbeck. It was directed by Antonio Margheriti, and is one of several Italian imitations of Raiders of the Lost Ark, shot in an exotic location involving the recovery of supernatural relics.

Cast
David Warbeck as Bob Jackson
Almanta Suska as Julie / April
Luciano Pigozzi as Greenwater (as Alan Collins)
John Steiner as David Franks
Protacio Dee as Yamato
Rene Abadeza as Kamutri
Rosemarie Lindt as Maude

Release
Hunters of the Golden Cobra was released in the United States in March 1984.

Critical reception
Fantastic Movie Musings & Ramblings wrote, "the violence is a bit nastier than that of RAIDERS, and the script seems like it was thrown together without much care, but I rather like the British soldier who is paired with the hero.  Still, this one is routine at best."

See also 
 List of Italian films of 1982

References

Sources

External links

1982 films
1980s action adventure films
1980s Italian-language films
Films directed by Antonio Margheriti
Films scored by Carlo Savina
Treasure hunt films
Italian action adventure films
Films shot in the Philippines
Cockfighting in film
1980s Italian films